Enfield Bullet may refer to:

Royal Enfield Bullet motorcycle
Enfield rifle ammunition